Andrea Cau is an Italian vertebrate paleontologist. He specializes in the study of dinosaur cladistics. Cau named the unique dromaeosaurid theropod, Halszkaraptor in 2017. He also reanalyzed the theropod Balaur, placing it as a basal avialan (primitive bird) rather than a dromaeosaur.

Personal life
Cau graduated in 2017 with a PhD in Life, Earth and Environmental Sciences.

References

Italian paleontologists
Year of birth missing (living people)
Living people
Place of birth missing (living people)